The First Time Ever (I Saw Your Face) is a 1972 album by pop vocalist Vikki Carr. The album was issued in the UK as "Song Sung Blue" with the same artwork (except for the album title) and "Big Hurt" replacing "The Hands of Time".

Track listing (US)
"The First Time Ever (I Saw Your Face)"
"(Last Night) I Didn't Get to Sleep at All"
"Theme from Summer of '42 (The Summer Knows)"
"Gypsies, Tramps and Thieves"
"Without You"
"Song Sung Blue"
"Speak Softly Love (Love Theme From The Godfather)"
"Cabaret"
"Help Me Make It Through the Night"
"The Hands of Time" (from Brian's Song)
"The Way of Love"

Track listing (UK)
"The First Time Ever (I Saw Your Face)" (Ewan MacColl)
"(Last Night) I Didn't Get to Sleep at All" (Tony Macaulay)
"Theme from Summer of '42 (The Summer Knows)'' (The Summer Knows)" (Marilyn Bergman, Alan Bergman, Michel Legrand)
"Gypsies, Tramps and Thieves" (Robert Stone)
"Without You" (Pete Ham, Tom Evans)
"Song Sung Blue" (Neil Diamond)
"Speak Softly Love (Love Theme From The Godfather)" (Larry Kusic, Nino Rota)
"Cabaret" (Fred Ebb, John Kander)
"Help Me Make It Through the Night" (Kris Kristofferson)
"Big Hurt" (Wayne Shanklin)
"The Way of Love" (Al Stillman, Jacques Dieval)

References

External links
Vikki Carr

1972 albums
Vikki Carr albums
Columbia Records albums
Albums produced by Snuff Garrett